Jamie Gauthier is an American Democratic politician and member of the Philadelphia City Council. In 2019, she was elected to represent the Third District, which covers much of West Philadelphia and Southwest Philadelphia.

Early life and career 
Gauthier was born in the Kingsessing neighborhood of Philadelphia. Her father, Leon Williams, ran for District Attorney of Philadelphia twice as an independent candidate. She received her undergraduate degree in Accounting from Temple University and her Masters in City Planning from the University of Pennsylvania.

Gauthier founded Mommy Grads, an organization dedicated to helping single mothers raise children while attending college. She worked as a program officer with the Local Initiatives Support Corporation before serving as executive director of the Sustainable Business Network of Greater Philadelphia from 2013 to 2017. In 2017, she became executive director of the Fairmount Park Conservancy.

Philadelphia City Council 
In January 2019, Gauthier announced she would challenge longtime incumbent Jannie Blackwell in the Democratic primary for Philadelphia City Council in the Third District, which covers much of West Philadelphia and Southwest Philadelphia. Blackwell had represented the district since 1992, when she succeeded her husband Lucien Blackwell, who previously held the seat for 17 years. Gauthier defeated Blackwell by 56%-44% in the May 2019 primary, in what was called "a huge upset over one of the biggest political dynasties in Philly politics." Gauthier faced no opposition in the general election.

See also
List of members of Philadelphia City Council since 1952

References 

Living people
Philadelphia City Council members
African-American city council members in Pennsylvania
African-American women in politics
Pennsylvania Democrats
Women city councillors in Pennsylvania
Year of birth missing (living people)
21st-century African-American people
21st-century African-American women